James Platten Vanderbilt (born November 17, 1975) is an American screenwriter and producer. He is best known for writing the films Zodiac (2007), The Amazing Spider-Man (2012) and its 2014 sequel, and Independence Day: Resurgence (2016). He also co-wrote and produced Scream (2022) and its 2023 sequel. Vanderbilt also contributed as producer for several films, including The House with a Clock in Its Walls (2018) and Ready or Not (2019).

Early life 
A member of the Vanderbilt family of New York, James Vanderbilt is the son of Alison Campbell (née Platten) and Alfred Gwynne Vanderbilt III.

Vanderbilt was raised in Norwalk, Connecticut, and attended school at New Canaan Country School. He is a graduate of St. Paul's School and the University of Southern California.

Career 
His production company, Mythology Entertainment, started in 2011. It was later reincorporated into Project X Entertainment as of 2019.

In May 2016, Mythology acquired intellectual property rights to Slender Man from the character's creator Eric Knudsen. Vanderbilt later produced a film adaptation of the character in 2018.

In 2020, Vanderbilt co-wrote the script for the fifth installment of the Scream franchise, starring Neve Campbell, David Arquette, Courteney Cox, Melissa Barrera, Jenna Ortega, Jack Quaid, Marley Shelton, Dylan Minnette, Mason Gooding, Kyle Gallner, Jasmin Savoy Brown, Mikey Madison and Sonia Ben Ammar. The film was released on January 14, 2022.

Filmography 

Executive producer
 Altered Carbon (2018)
 Suspiria (2018)
 American Dream/American Knightmare (Documentary)
 The Night Agent (2023)

References

External links 
 
 James Vanderbilt interview in Creative Screenwriting Magazine

1975 births
American people of Dutch descent
American male screenwriters
Living people
University of Southern California alumni
James
Film directors from Connecticut
Film producers from Connecticut
Writers from Norwalk, Connecticut
St. Paul's School (New Hampshire) alumni
Screenwriters from Connecticut
Jewish American writers